George Oywello (17 January 1939 - 1965) was a Ugandan boxer. Born in Gulu, Uganda, Oywello competed for Uganda in both the 1960 Olympics in Rome and the 1964 Olympics in Tokyo. In 1964 boxing in the heavyweight competition he was beaten by eventual gold medal winner, Joe Frazier. He died in a car accident in 1965.

1960 Olympic results
Below is the record of George Oywello, a Ugandan light heavyweight boxer who competed at the 1960 Rome Olympics:

 Round of 32: bye
 Round of 16: lost to Gheorghe Negrea (Romania) on points, 0-5.

1964 Olympics results
Below is the record of George Oywello, a Ugandan heavyweight boxer who competed at the 1964 Tokyo Olympics:

 Round of 16: lost to Joe Frazier (United States) referee stopped contest

1962 British Empire and Commonwealth Games
In the 1962 British Empire and Commonwealth Games in Perth, Western Australia, Oywello won a gold medal in the heavyweight competition beating New Zealander, Bill Kini in the final.

References

1939 births
Heavyweight boxers
Boxers at the 1964 Summer Olympics
Boxers at the 1960 Summer Olympics
Boxers at the 1962 British Empire and Commonwealth Games
People from Gulu District
Olympic boxers of Uganda
Commonwealth Games gold medallists for Uganda
1965 deaths
Ugandan male boxers
Commonwealth Games medallists in boxing
Medallists at the 1962 British Empire and Commonwealth Games